Daitō may refer to:

 Daitō Islands, Okinawa
 Daitō, Osaka, Japan
 Daitō (long sword)
 A tahōtō whose base measures 5x5 ken
 An alternate reading of the 84-stroke Japanese character taito 
 Toshiro Yoshiaki, a character in Ready Player One whose OASIS persona is Daito
 Former name of Daejeon during Japanese colonialism

People with the surname
, Japanese baseball player

Japanese-language surnames